Joseph Hawkins may refer to:
Joseph H. Hawkins (died 1823), U.S. Representative from Kentucky
Joseph Hawkins (New York politician) (1781–1832), U.S. Representative from New York
Joseph M. Hawkins, Alamo defender
Joey Hawkins (born 1981), American football player
Joe Hawkins, character in TV series Humans